Bason is a surname. Notable people with the surname include:

Brian Bason (born 1955), English football player
Fred Bason (1907–1973), English bookseller
John Bason (born 1957), English businessman
Samuel Bason (1894–1986), American banker and politician

See also 

 Beson
 Benson (surname)

English-language surnames
Surnames of English origin
Surnames of British Isles origin